Scutiger pes-caprae is a species of fungus in the family Albatrellaceae. It was first described officially as a species of Polyporus by Christian Hendrik Persoon in 1818. In recent decades, it was known most commonly as a species of Albatrellus until molecular research published by Canadian mycologist Serge Audet in 2010 revealed that it was more appropriate in an emended version of the genus Scutiger.

References

External links

Fungi described in 1818
Fungi of North America
Fungi of Europe